İctimai Television (“Public Television”), or İTV, is a public television channel in Azerbaijan. After its legal creation in early 2004, the station began broadcasting on 29 August 2005, making it the first independent public broadcaster in Azerbaijan. The channel is based in Baku.

Organisation
İTV is primarily funded through advertising and government payments.

The channel is operated by the Public Television and Radio Broadcasting Company, which consists of a nine member council whose members are approved by the President of Azerbaijan and a director general elected by the council and also approved by the President.

The company also operates the İctimai Radio public radio station, which commenced broadcasting on 10 January 2006. This arrangement, together with continued state financing, has been subject to criticism by non-governmental organizations on the grounds that the channel may be too closely connected to the government to be fully independent and unbiased.

Programming
İTV became a member of the European Broadcasting Union on 5 July 2007, allowing it to take part in events such as the Eurovision Song Contest, which it entered for the first time in 2008. Following Azerbaijan’s win in the Eurovision Song Contest 2011, İTV hosted the competition of 2012 in Baku.

The broadcaster was also supposed to host the Third Eurovision Dance Contest in Baku in 2009, but this event was postponed and eventually cancelled due to the lack of participants.

Logo history

References

External links

 Official website 

Television stations in Azerbaijan
Television networks in Azerbaijan
Television production companies of Azerbaijan
Azerbaijani-language television stations
Publicly funded broadcasters
European Broadcasting Union members
Television channels and stations established in 2005
2005 establishments in Azerbaijan
State media